The Bywater is a casual, New Orleans-inspired restaurant located in Los Gatos, California.  The restaurant was founded in 2016 by chef David Kinch, the owner and chef of Michelin 3-star-rated Manresa, also located in Los Gatos.  The name of the restaurant is a reference to the New Orleans neighborhood of the same name.

Awards
In 2016, The Bywater was awarded the Michelin Guide's Bib Gourmand designation for "excellent food at a reasonable price" and was recognized by the San Francisco Chronicle's Michael Bauer as a Bay Area "Top 10 new restaurant of 2016".

References

External links
 

Restaurants in the San Francisco Bay Area
Los Gatos, California
Restaurants established in 2016
2016 establishments in California